IFM 102.2 (IFM 102.2 Radio) is a South African community radio station based in Gauteng.

Coverage areas 
Vanderbijlpark
Mittal Steel Works
Vereeniging
Sasolburg
Sebokeng
Sharpeville
Meyerton
Evaton
And parts of Lenasia

Broadcast languages
Afrikaans
English
Zulu
Sotho

Broadcast time
24/7

Target audience
LSM Groups 6 - 10
Age Group 25 - 49
Mainly Mittal Steelworkers and their families in the surrounding communities

Programme format
30% Talk
70% Music

Listenership Figures

Location
The station's physical address is:
Arcelor Mittal, HR Building - Main Gate, Delfos Boulevard, Vanderbijlpark

References

External links
 Official Website
 SAARF Website

Community radio stations in South Africa
Mass media in Gauteng